KQRV (96.9 FM, "The River") is a commercial radio station in Deer Lodge, Montana, broadcasting to the Butte, Montana area. KQRV airs a soft oldies format.  In August 2017 KQRV changed their format from country to a smooth gold based oldies format but still keeps the River brand.

External links

QRV
Classic hits radio stations in the United States